Grevillea lullfitzii is a species of flowering plant in the family Proteaceae and is endemic to a relatively small area of inland Western Australia. It is a spreading shrub with deeply divided leaves, the lobes linear and sharply-pointed, and clusters of greyish-white and cream flowers with an off-white style.

Description

Taxonomy
Grevillea lullfitzii was first formally described in 1986 by Donald McGillivray in his book, New Names in Grevillea (Proteaceae) from specimens collected in 1964. The specific epithet, (lullfitzii) honours Fred Lullfitz, who collected the type specimen.

Distribution and habitat
This grevillea grows in woodland on granite hills near Lake King in the Mallee bioregion of inland Western Australia.

Conservation status
Grevillea lullfitzii is listed as "Priority One" by the Government of Western Australia Department of Biodiversity, Conservation and Attractions, meaning that it is known from only one or a few locations which are potentially at risk.

See also
 List of Grevillea species

References

lullfitzii
Proteales of Australia
Flora of Western Australia
Taxa named by Donald McGillivray
Plants described in 1986